The 1937 Kansas City Monarchs baseball team represented the Kansas City Monarchs in the Negro American League (NAL) during the 1937 baseball season. The team compiled a 51–22–1 record and won the NAL pennant. 

The team featured four individuals who were later inducted into the Baseball Hall of Fame: manager/pitcher Andy Cooper, left fielder Willard Brown, and pitcher Hilton Smith. 

The team's leading batters were:
 Willard Brown - .380 batting average, .680 slugging percentage, 10 home runs, 57 RBIs in 53 games
 Second baseman Newt Allen - .314 batting average in 51 games

The team's leading pitchers were Hilton Smith (11–4, 1.61 ERA), Vet Barnes (8–2, 2.27 ERA), and Johnny Markham (6–0, 4.43 ERA).

References

1937 in sports in Missouri
Negro league baseball seasons
Kansas City Monarchs